Moments: Mighty Sound is the tenth live album by California-based worship collective Bethel Music, it is also their fifteenth album overall. On May 11, 2018, the album was released by the collective's imprint label, Bethel Music.

Background
Bethel Music published on its social media channels that an upcoming release would be unveiled on Friday, May 11, 2018 at 9AM Pacific Standard Time. Moments: Mighty Sound was released on that day. Touted as Bethel Music's "debut spontaneous worship album," Moments: Mighty Sound is a collection of twelve songs recorded live at Bethel Church in Redding, California. The collection is said to be representing "the merging of the stewarded [songs] and the divine [spontaneous], where earthly efforts collide with Heaven's intervention." Most songs contain extended times of spontaneous worship as well as new spontaneous worship songs are found on the record.

The worship leaders featured on Moments: Mighty Sound are Amanda Cook, Steffany Gretzinger, Kalley Heiligenthal, Melissa Helser, Brian Johnson, Jenn Johnson, Paul McClure, Brittany Mondesir, Leeland Mooring, Jeremy Riddle, Molly Skaggs and Reuben Morgan of Hillsong Worship.

Critical reception

Kelly Meade assigned the album a three-point-seven star rating at Today's Christian Entertainment, saying "If you allow yourselves to be completely open and drawn in by the words being sung, you may find an even deeper connection to Christ and your relationship strengthened as you listen to the passionate performances." In a Worship Musician Magazine review of the album, Gerod Bass said "If Bethel wanted a true 'get-out-of-the-way-and-let-the-spirit-move' type of album, they accomplished it with this one." Bass concluded that "Moments: Mighty Sound is a wonderful reminder that we need to stop every day to let God have his way in us, and to have our own moments with Him."

Commercial performance
In the United States, for the week ending May 17, 2018, Moments: Mighty Sound earned sales of 5,000 equivalent album units, thus registering at No. 2 on the U.S. Billboard Christian Albums chart (dated May 26). Moments: Mighty Sound is Bethel Music's tenth album to appear in the Top 3 sector of the Christian Albums chart. The album was also the thirteenth best-selling digital album in the same week, reached No. 10 on the Independent Albums chart, whilst appearing on the all-inclusive Billboard 200 chart at No. 168.

Track listing

Charts

Album

Songs

Release history

References

2018 live albums
Bethel Music albums